Charles Paine (April 15, 1799 – July 6, 1853) was an American Whig politician, woolen mill owner, merchant, railroad builder, and the 15th governor of Vermont.

Biography
Paine was the son of Elijah Paine and Sarah (Porter) Paine, and was born in Williamstown, Vermont. He graduated from Harvard University in 1820, and became active in several business ventures. Though he never married, he had two children.

Career
Paine moved to Northfield, Vermont in the early part of the nineteenth century to run the family woolen mill. He operated this business until it was destroyed by fire in 1848. He had various other business interests including a hotel and a store, but he is most often remembered as the individual who brought railroads to Vermont. He founded the Vermont Central Railroad and served as the first president of the company.

In Northfield, Paine held the offices of Town Selectman and Moderator of the Town Meeting. In his political life he was a member of the Vermont House of Representatives from 1828 through 1829. He was the 15th Governor of Vermont from 1841 until 1843. During his tenure, a stricter accounting of public funds was established.

As the founder and president of the Vermont Central Railroad Paine built its headquarters in his home town of Northfield, despite the hilly terrain, earning the enmity of residents of larger, more accessible nearby towns. In the extensive yard, engines and railroad cars were built and repaired.  In 1853 the Vermont Central Railroad went into bankruptcy due to overexpansion and, in some cases, mismanagement. The railroad was placed under receivership and renamed the Central Vermont Railroad. Its headquarters were moved to St. Albans.

Death
Paine died in Waco, Texas after three weeks of dysentery while helping the Southern Pacific Railroad choose a route. He is interred at Elmwood Cemetery, Northfield, Washington County, Vermont. The home of the former governor, 75 South Main Street, Northfield, Vermont, is where the Northfield Historical Society is housed, connected to the Brown Public Library of the town.

References

Further reading
 New England Puritan (published in Boston), Thursday, August 4, 1853

External links
 The Political Graveyard
 Central Vermont Chamber of Commerce
 National Governors Association

Northfield Historical Society

1799 births
1853 deaths
Harvard College alumni
Governors of Vermont
Vermont Whigs
People from Williamstown, Vermont
Members of the Vermont House of Representatives
Whig Party state governors of the United States
19th-century American politicians
People from Northfield, Vermont